Chatchai Paiseetong was a Thai Muay Thai fighter. He was a two-times Lumpinee Stadium champion and Sports Authority of Thailand fighter of the year during the golden era of Muay Thai.

Biography & career
His nickname Samart 2 is a reference to the Muay Thai legendary Samart Payakaroon who trained at the same gym. Paiseetong was compared to him for his elegance and technical proficiency in the ring.

His peak happened during the year 1993 at the age of 19. That yeah he had 7 wins and 3 losses, for this performance he earned the Thailand Sport Authority FIghter of the Year award. Chatchai's prime was relatively short as he struggled to maintain his weight.

On February 1, 2002, Paiseetong fought Alexei Pekarchyk. After the bout he had a stroke and was transported to the hospital where his death from heart failure was pronounced at 1:30 AM the next night. He was 28 years old.

Titles & honours
Lumpinee Stadium
 1993 2x Lumpinee Stadium (122 lbs) champion

Awards
 1993 Lumpinee Stadium Fighter of the Year
 1993 Sports Authority of Thailand Fighter of the Year

Fight record

|- style="background:#fbb;"
| 2002-02-01 || Loss ||align=left| Alexei Pekarchyk ||  || Bangkok, Thailand || Decision || 5||3:00
|- style="background:#;"
| 1999-11-05 || ||align=left| Buatong Sitputapim || Lumpinee Stadium || Bangkok, Thailand || || ||
|- style="background:#fbb;"
| 1998-03-10 || Loss ||align=left| Rambojiew Por.Thubtim || Lumpinee Stadium || Bangkok, Thailand || Decision || 5||3:00

|- style="background:#cfc;"
| 1997- || Win ||align=left| Jompoplek Sor.Sumalee || Lumpinee Stadium || Bangkok, Thailand || Decision || 5||3:00

|- style="background:#fbb;"
| 1997- || Loss||align=left| Jompoplek Sor.Sumalee || Lumpinee Stadium || Bangkok, Thailand || Decision || 5||3:00
|- style="background:#fbb;"
| 1996-11-26 || Loss ||align=left| Dawudon Sor.Suchart || Lumpinee Stadium || Bangkok, Thailand || Decision || 5||3:00
|- style="background:#fbb;"
| 1996-08-23 || Loss ||align=left| Lamnamoon Sor.Sumalee || Lumpinee Stadium || Bangkok, Thailand || Decision || 5||3:00 
|-
! style=background:white colspan=9 |
|- style="background:#cfc;"
| 1996- || Win||align=left| Keng Singkankhonkui || Lumpinee Stadium || Bangkok, Thailand || Decision || 5||3:00
|- style="background:#fbb;"
| 1996-04-19 || Loss ||align=left| Lamnamoon Sor.Sumalee || Lumpinee Stadium || Bangkok, Thailand || Decision || 5||3:00
|- style="background:#cfc;"
| 1996-03-19 || Win ||align=left| Jompoplek Sor.Sumalee || Lumpinee Stadium || Bangkok, Thailand || Decision || 5||3:00
|- style="background:#cfc;"
| 1996-02-15 ||Win ||align=left| Lamnamoon Sor.Sumalee || Lumpinee Stadium || Bangkok, Thailand || KO (Right Hook)|| 3||
|- style="background:#fbb;"
| ? || Loss ||align=left| Kaoponglek Luksuratham || Lumpinee Stadium || Bangkok, Thailand || Decision || 5 || 3:00
|- style="background:#cfc;"
| 1995-12-21 ||Win ||align=left| Prabsuk Sit Santad || Lumpinee Stadium || Bangkok, Thailand || Decision || 5|| 3:00
|- style="background:#fbb;"
| 1995-09-12 || Loss ||align=left| Namkabuan Nongkeepahuyuth || Lumpinee Stadium || Bangkok, Thailand  || Decision || 5 || 3:00
|- style="background:#cfc;"
| 1995- || Win||align=left| Therdkiat Sitthepitak || Lumpinee Stadium || Bangkok, Thailand  || Decision || 5 || 3:00

|- style="background:#cfc;"
| ? || Win||align=left| Den Muangsurin || Lumpinee Stadium || Bangkok, Thailand  || Decision || 5 || 3:00
|-  style="background:#cfc;"
| 1995-06-10 || Win||align=left| Cherry Sor Wanich || Lumpinee Stadium || Bangkok, Thailand || Decision || 5 || 3:00
|- style="background:#fbb;"
| 1995-05-05 || Loss ||align=left| Lamnamoon Sor.Sumalee || Lumpinee Stadium || Bangkok, Thailand || Decision || 5||3:00

|- style="background:#fbb;"
| 1995-03-03 || Loss ||align=left| Samkor Chor.Rathchatasupak || Lumpinee Stadium || Bangkok, Thailand || Decision || 5 || 3:00
|- style="background:#cfc;"
| 1994-12-21 || Win||align=left| Prabsuk Sitsantad || Rajadamnern Stadium Anniversary || Bangkok, Thailand  || Decision || 5 || 3:00
|- style="background:#c5d2ea;"
| 1994-11-29 || Draw ||align=left| Therdkiat Sitthepitak || Lumpinee Stadium || Bangkok, Thailand  || Decision || 5 || 3:00
|- style="background:#cfc;"
| 1994-11-15 || Win ||align=left| Hansuk Prasathinpanomrung || Lumpinee Stadium || Bangkok, Thailand  || KO (Head Kick)|| 3 ||
|- style="background:#fbb;"
| 1994-10-19 || Loss ||align=left| Wanwiset Kaennorasing || Rajadamnern Stadium || Bangkok, Thailand  || Decision || 5 || 3:00
|-  style="background:#fbb;"
| 1994-09-09|| Loss ||align=left| Mathee Jadeepitak || Lumpinee Stadium || Bangkok, Thailand || Decision ||5  ||3:00
|-
! style=background:white colspan=9 |
|- style="background:#fbb;"
| 1994-08-09 || Loss ||align=left| Namkabuan Nongkeepahuyuth || Lumpinee Stadium || Bangkok, Thailand  || Decision || 5 || 3:00
|-  style="background:#cfc;" 
| 1994-06-20|| Win ||align=left| Therdkiat Sitthepitak || Rajadamnern Stadium || Bangkok, Thailand || Decision ||5 ||3:00
|-  style="background:#cfc;"
| 1994-05-27|| Win ||align=left| Mathee Jadeepitak || Lumpinee Stadium || Bangkok, Thailand || TKO (High kick) || 2||
|-  style="background:#fbb;"
| 1994-04-29|| Loss||align=left| Boonlai Sor.Thanikul || Lumpinee Stadium || Bangkok, Thailand || Decision || 5 || 3:00
|- style="background:#fbb;"
| 1994-03-08 || Loss ||align=left| Karuhat Sor.Supawan || Lumpinee Stadium ||  Bangkok, Thailand  || Decision || 5 || 3:00

|- style="background:#cfc;"
| 1994-02-15 || Win||align=left| Lamnamoon Sor.Sumalee || Lumpinee Stadium || Bangkok, Thailand || KO || 3||

|- style="background:#fbb;"
| 1994-01-28 || Loss||align=left| Kaensak Sor.Ploenjit|| Lumpinee Stadium ||  Bangkok, Thailand || Decision || 5 || 3:00
|- style="background:#fbb;"
| 1993-12-17 || Loss ||align=left| Karuhat Sor.Supawan || Lumpinee Stadium ||  Bangkok, Thailand  || Decision || 5 || 3:00
|-
! style=background:white colspan=9 |
|- style="background:#cfc;"
| 1993-11-30 || Win ||align=left| Wangchannoi Sor Palangchai || Lumpinee Stadium ||  Bangkok, Thailand  || Decision || 5 || 3:00
|-
! style=background:white colspan=9 |
|- style="background:#fbb;"
| 1993-10-22 || Loss||align=left| Wangchannoi Sor Palangchai || Lumpinee Stadium ||  Bangkok, Thailand  || Decision || 5 || 3:00
|-
! style=background:white colspan=9 |
|- style="background:#cfc;"
| 1993-09-17 || Win ||align=left| Karuhat Sor.Supawan || Lumpinee Stadium ||  Bangkok, Thailand  || Decision || 5 || 3:00
|- style="background:#cfc;"
| 1993-08-31 || Win ||align=left| Boonlai Sor.Thanikul || Lumpinee Stadium ||  Bangkok, Thailand  || Decision || 5 || 3:00
|-
! style=background:white colspan=9 |
|- style="background:#cfc;"
| 1993-07-09 || Win ||align=left| Jaroensap Kiatbanchong || Lumpinee Stadium ||  Bangkok, Thailand  || KO (Spinning back Elbow) || 5 ||
|- style="background:#cfc;"
| 1993-06-08 || Win ||align=left| Chainoi Muangsurin || Lumpinee Stadium ||  Bangkok, Thailand  || KO (High Kick) || 5 ||
|- style="background:#cfc;"
| 1993-05-07 || Win ||align=left| Kruekchai Kitayongyut || Lumpinee Stadium ||  Bangkok, Thailand  || Decision || 5 || 3:00
|- style="background:#fbb;"
| 1993-02-26 || Loss ||align=left| Meechok Sor.Ploenjit || Lumpinee Stadium ||  Bangkok, Thailand  || Decision || 5 || 3:00
|-  style="background:#cfc;"
| 1993-01-29 || Win ||align=left| Detduang Por Pongsawang || Lumpinee Stadium || Bangkok, Thailand || Decision || 5 || 3:00
|-  style="background:#cfc;"
| 1992-12-29 || Win ||align=left| Detduang Por Pongsawang || Lumpinee Stadium || Bangkok, Thailand || Decision || 5 || 3:00
|-  style="background:#fbb;"
| 1992-10-24 ||Loss||align=left| Kongklai Sit Kru Od || Lumpinee Stadium || Bangkok, Thailand || KO || 2 ||
|- style="background:#cfc;"
| 1992-05-02 || Win ||align=left| Paruhatlek Sitchunthong || Lumpinee Stadium ||  Bangkok, Thailand  || Decision ||5 ||3:00
|-  style="background:#fbb;"
| 1992-04-07 ||Loss||align=left| Lamnamoon Sor.Sumalee || Lumpinee Stadium || Bangkok, Thailand || Decision || 5 || 3:00
|-  style="background:#fbb;"
| 1992-02-07 || Loss ||align=left| Toto Por Pongsawang || Lumpinee Stadium || Bangkok, Thailand || Decision || 5 || 3:00
|-  style="background:#cfc;"
| 1991-12-29 || Win ||align=left| Fahpichit Sor.Rachada || Lumpinee Stadium || Bangkok, Thailand || Decision || 5 || 3:00
|-  style="background:#;" comprend pas https://www.facebook.com/photo/?fbid=3376655799083587&set=bc.AbocoPajexrJUOUV61R8K7R_1EbbGiq_usvZ_X7JuSaq080jfnZ1e1OPPUQKfdz4PO90hImzXzK7RfFvKOTviSMUy7WVo8mFhvoxf5Qat7ked9bG4D6oYzkwjlPaoG04F-eGE-0VY4rv7qFhDuBAGlLCRIou5YxQRFfC28FSwd40Gpfuc40ORMES2WP2HPd2yTFeCbZr7irrpenRxCyohPn0frDzu69bsASdtOEvi901lDcxyp46gtrEyhYvfuTpP459S969ekG_hYXP_TSLzo5uwyPpAOHsL3j1t4h42bMytognuQ18DS3ECZ_X3uffb8E&opaqueCursor=Abp5PDLvfsbb4u2JvMzpPm0bQOZxf51pQkLg73jl36JLJw1h7raKluJcZTy5B4XrGeOiIm0Cqo4iIzdXxSWXj1ltKbRxTonsieDQ4EhJTslZdiwQThKvqkJKFOGAzdjvMVMKDNuLtPy4nt0n6EYnTalBJxQ0D0CVGSVbMdM4iuAqXEZAlBdkJYZqFHsEHG81GsFS7hqN5Xb7QqJCGej6UaJvQTLEVLvaEOasJbLNUnf0_icS2OrVG1tccNnJ6yDYEM86Nw5pc_QO_0pUaw7cExlkCGXsa4f6dPU52GW-oL18SniaEr2c6VZLnggfKRb50LvORFWn271fewAYfJPQ57O-19MJcR5QTWuvmdUIQvElIRYOKIUMli0qyHiPfEDIpB0TW7kpjutkwTkJ0_xtJdR1pva6r7T1AFbeUzFGUegUnghaPr08-ItbmGKgFj9ZPIfqYI9cJDikXEzkDKpNt2kByqTo0DAosEbKD56ITjioT2gJAeM99fbphXektmY5CwYaEjPQ8tCsQSGQ16cdiL1u-B-Ho421y-V-vP4O4u-c95hDHeTmsMmmAGFJ9l1-rJM
| 1991-10-25 ||  ||align=left| Morakot Sor.Tammarangsri || Lumpinee Stadium || Bangkok, Thailand || Decision|| 5 || 3:00
|-  style="background:#cfc;"
| 1991-09-21 || Win ||align=left| Pichai Wor.Walapon || Lumpinee Stadium || Bangkok, Thailand || KO (Head Kick)|| 4 ||
|-  style="background:#fbb;"
| 1991-04-30 || Loss ||align=left| Methanoi Maliwan || Lumpinee Stadium || Bangkok, Thailand || Decision || 5 || 3:00
|-  style="background:#cfc;"
| 1991-03-05 || Win ||align=left| Samingprai Sor.Rungnakorn || Lumpinee Stadium || Bangkok, Thailand || KO ||  ||
|-  style="background:#cfc;"
| 1991-02-09 || Win ||align=left| Dejpanom Por.Paoin || Lumpinee Stadium || Bangkok, Thailand || KO (Knee)|| 2 ||
|-  style="background:#cfc;"
| 1990 || Win ||align=left| Rungchai || Lumpinee Stadium || Bangkok, Thailand || Decision|| 5 || 3:00 
|-
| colspan=9 | Legend:

References

1974 births
2002 deaths
Chatchai Paiseetong
Chatchai Paiseetong
Chatchai Paiseetong